Seydlitz was a German trawler built in 1936 which was converted into a Vorpostenboot for the Kriegsmarine during World War II, serving as V 201 Seydlitz and  V 211 Seydlitz. She was bombed and sunk off the Channel Islands on 20 March 1944.

Description
The engine was built by Deschimag, Wesermünde.

History 
In 1936, Seydlitz was constructed as yard number 570 by the German shipbuilder Seebeckwerft AG as a civilian fishing trawler for F. A. Pust Hochseefischerei AG, Wesermünde. The Code Letters DFCP were allocated, as was the fishing boat registration PG 508. On 1 October 1939, the Kriegsmarine requisitioned the vessel and commissioned it as a Vorpostenboot in the 2 Vorpostenflotille under the designation V 201 Seydlitz. The ship was redesignated V 211 Seydlitz on 20 October. With the rest of the 2 Vorpostenflotille, Seydlitz operated in the North Sea from 1939 to 1940 and in the English Channel from 1940 to 1944.

Seydlitz was sunk by British fighter-bombers on 20 March 1944 in the English Channel between  Guernsey, Channel Islands and Barfleur, Manche, France. Twenty-seven crew were killed.

References 

1936 ships
Fishing vessels of Germany
Steamships of Germany
Auxiliary ships of the Kriegsmarine
Maritime incidents in March 1944
Ships sunk by British aircraft